The Ouysse is an approximately  long river in the Lot (department) department, south-central France. Its source is near the small town Lacapelle-Marival. It flows west to the village Thémines, from where it continues as a subterranean river through the limestone formations south of Gramat. It emerges near Rocamadour, about 20 km west from where it submerged, receives its tributary Alzou and flows into the Dordogne near Lacave.

References

Rivers of France
Rivers of Lot (department)
Rivers of Occitania (administrative region)